Namibithamnus is a genus of flowering plants belonging to the family Asteraceae.

Its native range is Namibia.

Species
Species:

Namibithamnus dentatus 
Namibithamnus obionifolius

References

Asteraceae
Asteraceae genera